Zeleni is a rural locality (a village) in Novoalexandrovskoye Rural Settlement, Suzdalsky District, Vladimir Oblast, Russia. The population was 119 as of 2010. There are 16 streets.

Geography 
Zeleni is located 43 km southwest of Suzdal (the district's administrative centre) by road. Maslenka is the nearest rural locality.

References 

Rural localities in Suzdalsky District
Vladimirsky Uyezd